Meatheads Burgers & Fries (commonly referred to as Meatheads) is an American fast food retailer of high-end hamburgers and other related menu items based in Illinois.

The company was founded by Tom Jednorowicz, formerly an executive at Potbelly Sandwich Works and Einstein Bros. Bagels.  Meatheads started in Bloomington, Illinois in 2007 and became a popular spot among students of Illinois State University and the popular young crowd.  The company has since opened fourteen more locations in the Chicago area, first entering that market in 2009.  As of October 2016, 17 locations are in operation, one of which is in Champaign, Illinois near the University of Illinois at Urbana–Champaign campus.

Among a growing number of specialty burger chains in the United States,  Meatheads attempts to differentiate from its competition such as Five Guys and Smashburger by cutting a customer's fries in front of them, similar to west-coast based In-N-Out Burger. Meatheads describes itself as a "fast-casual" chain as opposed to a traditional fast food chain.

With reported annual sales in 2011 of approximately $5 million, the chain is currently composed of company-owned stores, and has not implemented a franchise model.

On April 9, 2021, Meatheads Burgers & Fries filed for Chapter 11 bankruptcy protection. The chain's parent company, Crave Brands LLC, filed for Chapter 11 bankruptcy protection the same day.

Notes

References

External links
 

2007 establishments in Illinois
Companies based in Bloomington–Normal
Fast casual restaurants
Hamburger restaurants
Regional restaurant chains in the United States
Restaurants established in 2007
Restaurants in Illinois
American companies established in 2007
Companies that filed for Chapter 11 bankruptcy in 2021
